Ilona Jeannette Rodgers (born 28 April 1942) is an actress of stage, television and film. Born in Harrogate, West Riding of Yorkshire, where she started her career, she later went on to appear in New Zealand and Australian productions.
 
Rodgers has also worked in American including in Hercules: The Legendary Journeys and Power Rangers

Biography

Early life and career in the United Kingdom
Rodgers, a native of Yorkshire, trained in both Bristol and Surrey, starting her career on the stage. Breakthrough roles came in British television, including Carol in The Sensorites, a six-episode adventure in the BBC science-fiction series Doctor Who. She also acted in an adaptation of Martin Chuzzlewit, and made guest appearances in The Avengers and Adam Adamant Lives!. She had a guest role in America in The Beverly Hillbillies and The Saint. Her final British screen credit was an episode of Paul Temple in 1970, before she emigrated to New Zealand.

Career in New Zealand
Rodgers first lived in New Zealand from 1973, appearing in soap opera Close to Home and successful goldmining drama Hunter's Gold (retitled Scott Hunter in some territories).

Career in Australia
Between 1978 and the mid-1980s she lived in Australia. There, she appeared in television programmes The Sullivans, over 200 episodes of Sons and Daughters (as Patricia Hamilton's sister, Margaret Dunne) and the 1985 Australian miniseries Anzacs (as Lady Thea Barrington), as well as nine episodes of Prisoner in 1983 as character Zara Moonbeam, an imprisoned medium who claimed to have clairvoyant powers.

Return to New Zealand
After relocating back to New Zealand, her work included medical soap Shortland Street and presenting duties on a light entertainment and advertorial program called Good Morning.

Rodger's best-known role in New Zealand is probably TV series Gloss. She starred in Gloss for three seasons, from 1987 to 1990, playing bossy magazine editor Maxine Redfern. The series was about a fictional publishing empire run by the Redfern family.
Rodgers played the Australian wife of New Zealand comedian Billy T. James in the final, sitcom version of The Billy T James Show (1990).

Stage work
Her stage work has included the one-woman play Shirley Valentine, By Degrees written by Roger Hall, and Three Tall Women by Edward Albee.

Filmography

Film

Television

References

External links
 
 NZ On Screen Biography  Ilona Rodgers | NZ On Screen

1942 births
Australian soap opera actresses
British actresses
British television actresses
English emigrants to New Zealand
English emigrants to Australia
Living people
Logie Award winners
People from Harrogate